Motion with four signatures is an important milestone in the parliamentary history of Turkey.

Background
The Turkish Republic was proclaimed on 29 October 1923. However the Republican People's Party (CHP) was the only party in the parliament. Although two times an opposition party was founded (the Progressive Republican Party of 1924 and the Liberal Republican Party of 1930) both were short lived parties and the Independent Group, an artificially formed opposition group in the CHP was ineffective. But towards the end of the Second World War, an intraparty opposition group was formed in CHP. The most notable member of this group was Celâl Bayar, a former prime minister.(1937-1939)

Land reform
Just after the Second World War the law draft submitted by the government about the land reform (titled "provision of land to farmers") caused a split in CHP. Some land owners who were CHP deputies opposed the draft. In these discussions Adnan Menderes, a deputy from Aydın Province and a land owner,  proved himself as an able debater.

The motion
On 12 June 1945, one day after the Land Reform law, four CHP deputies submitted a motion about a renovation of the party regulations. This motion is known as The motion with four signatures. The co-signers were Celal Bayar, Adnan Menderes, Refik Koraltan and Fuat Köprülü. But their motion was rejected on the ground that the party was already taking steps towards a more democratic environment. This rejection brought the intraparty opposition into the open. Two of the signatories Adnan Menderes and Fuat Köprülü heavily criticised the party and both were dismissed from the CHP on 21 September 1945. Refik Koraltan followed them. On 26 September 1945 Celal Bayar resigned from the parliament, but he kept his seat in the party until November of that year.

Aftermath
On 7 January 1946 the four signatories founded the Democrat Party (DP). After the DP won the 1950 elections. Celal Bayar became president, Adnan Menderes prime minister, Refik Koraltan Parliament speaker and Fuat Köprülü became the Minister of Foreign Affairs.

Gallery

References

1945 in Turkey
Politics of Turkey
Democrat Party (Turkey, 1946–1961) politicians
Republican People's Party (Turkey) politicians
1945 in Turkish politics